Rajesh Pandey (born 19 March 1959) is a member of the Bharatiya Janata Party. He was a member of 16th Lok Sabha from Kushinagar Lok Sabha constituency.

Personal life 
Rajesh Pandey was born on 19 March 1959 to Raj Mangal Pandey and Malti Pandey in Kushinagar city of Uttar Pradesh. He completed his Post Graduate Diploma in Business Administration (PGDBA) from the Institute of Productivity and Management, Lucknow. He married Sudha Pandey on 18 February 1980, with whom he has a son and two daughters. Pandey is a builder and agriculturalist by profession.

Politics  
Pandey was elected Member of the Legislative Council Uttar Pradesh Legislative Council  for the first time from Deoria Local Authority Constituency in 1991 and was re-elected for the second term in 1997.  He is the President and Patron of several Degree Colleges and Inter-Colleges in Kasia, Kushinagar and Deoria. As an MLC, he has shouldered many important responsibilities such as, Chairman of Privilege Committee; Deputy Leader, U.P. Vidhan Mandal Dal; Presiding Officer, U.P. Vidhan Parishad. and he has discharged these numerous responsibilities with utmost efficiency.

He has won the 2014 Indian general elections from the Kushi Nagar (Lok Sabha constituency) defeating R. P. N. Singh of INC .

References

1959 births
Living people
India MPs 2014–2019
Lok Sabha members from Uttar Pradesh
People from Kushinagar district
Bharatiya Janata Party politicians from Uttar Pradesh
Members of the Uttar Pradesh Legislative Council